Walker Lake is the source of the Kobuk River in northwestern Alaska (emptying into Kotzebue Sound). The lake is located near the easternmost part of Northwest Arctic Borough, deep in the remote interior of northern Alaska. Explored during an expedition led by John C. Cantwell in 1885, under the authority of the Revenue Marine. Also known as "Big Fish Lake", Inupiaq legend in the area told of giant, ferocious fish that inhabited the waters. An attempt by a native with the Cantwell expedition to catch one of these giant fish involved a hook made of an entire set of reindeer antlers baited with a whole goose.

In 1968, Walker Lake, was designated as a National Natural Landmark by the National Park Service.

References

Further reading 
Sherwood, M. (1965). Exploration of Alaska: 1865–1900. New Haven and London: Yale University Press.

See also 
List of lakes of Alaska
List of National Natural Landmarks
List of reported lake monsters

Lakes of Alaska
Bodies of water of Northwest Arctic Borough, Alaska
National Natural Landmarks in Alaska